Salvador Pérez Martínez (born 8 May 1990), known as Salva Chamorro, is a Spanish professional footballer who plays as a striker.

Club career
Born in Orihuela, Valencian Community, Chamorro, spent the vast majority of his career in the Spanish lower leagues, starting out at Villarreal CF B then going on to represent CP Cacereño and CD Teruel. In the summer of 2011 he signed with FC Cartagena, still on loan from Villarreal CF, making his professional debut on 27 August in a 2–0 away loss against Hércules CF and scoring his first goal in the Segunda División the following 7 January in the 2–0 home win over SD Huesca, as the season ended in relegation.

Chamorro subsequently returned to Segunda División B, where he appeared for Villarreal B, CD Atlético Baleares, UE Llagostera and Lleida Esportiu. He helped the second club promote to the second level for the first ever in 2014, netting 11 times playoffs included.

Chamorro signed for Scottish side Hamilton Academical in July 2015, but he left after less than a month because international clearance could not be processed, joining C.D. Tondela from Portugal instead. He made his Primeira Liga debut on 27 September, coming on as an 80th-minute substitute for Dolly Menga in a 1–0 defeat at C.S. Marítimo.

In his last game, Chamorro featured only six minutes but was still able to contribute to a 2–2 away draw against league leaders Sporting CP, scoring the final equaliser after a counter-attack. After terminating his contract citing personal reasons, he returned to his country and signed with FC Barcelona B until 30 June 2017.

Chamorro moved to Hong Kong Premier League team Hong Kong Pegasus FC in the summer of 2016. However, after appearing rarely over the course of one single season, his contract was not renewed.

Chamorro continued to switch clubs and countries in the following years, representing Real Murcia, UD Logroñés (both in the Spanish third tier), Ittihad Tanger (Morocco), Doxa Drama FC (Football League Greece) and Mohun Bagan AC (Indian I-League).

Honours
Llagostera
Segunda División B: 2013–14

Mohun Bagan
Durand Cup runner-up: 2019

References

External links

1990 births
Living people
People from Orihuela
Sportspeople from the Province of Alicante
Spanish footballers
Footballers from the Valencian Community
Association football forwards
Segunda División players
Segunda División B players
Tercera División players
Villarreal CF C players
Villarreal CF B players
CP Cacereño players
CD Teruel footballers
FC Cartagena footballers
CD Atlético Baleares footballers
UE Costa Brava players
Lleida Esportiu footballers
FC Barcelona Atlètic players
Real Murcia players
UD Logroñés players
Mar Menor FC players
Primeira Liga players
C.D. Tondela players
Hong Kong Premier League players
TSW Pegasus FC players
Ittihad Tanger players
Football League (Greece) players
Doxa Drama F.C. players
I-League players
Mohun Bagan AC players
Spanish expatriate footballers
Expatriate footballers in Portugal
Expatriate footballers in Hong Kong
Expatriate footballers in Morocco
Expatriate footballers in Greece
Expatriate footballers in India
Spanish expatriate sportspeople in Portugal
Spanish expatriate sportspeople in Hong Kong
Spanish expatriate sportspeople in Greece
Spanish expatriate sportspeople in India